Hans-Georg Kraus (born 25 October 1949) is a former professional German footballer.

Kraus made 37 appearances in the Fußball-Bundesliga for Fortuna Düsseldorf and Tennis Borussia Berlin during his playing career.

References

External links
 

1949 births
Living people
German footballers
Association football defenders
Bundesliga players
2. Bundesliga players
Fortuna Düsseldorf players
Tennis Borussia Berlin players